Aichryson dumosum is a critically endangered species of succulent plant of the family Crassulaceae endemic to Madeira.

Description
Petals , lanceolate, bright golden yellow with a dorsal central rib

Distribution and Habitat
The species is endemic to one single locality on Calheta Municipality, Madeira Island and is estimated to have around 50 to 250 individuals occupying only . It grows in crevices and sheltered areas typical for micro-habitats consisting of an agglomeration of rocks.

It is mainly threatened by invasive species, trampling, fires, droughts and landslides.

References

dumosum
Endemic flora of Madeira